Jack Pierce may refer to:

Jack Pierce (hurdler) (born 1962), American hurdler
Jack Pierce (make-up artist) (1889–1968), Hollywood makeup artist
Jack Pierce (baseball) (1948–2012), former Major League Baseball player
Jack Pierce (oilman) (1924–1991), Canadian oil and gas executive
Jack Pierce (politician) (born 1937), former politician in Ontario, Canada

See also
John Pierce (disambiguation)